The Yenikend reservoir is a large reservoir in the Shamkir Rayon of northwestern Azerbaijan. It is the third largest reservoir in the Caucasus after the Mingachevir and Shamkir reservoirs.

Overview
Yenikend reservoir is located 14 km to the east of Shamkir reservoir. The reservoir with the 150 megawatt four turbine hydroelectric power station was built on Kura River and released for exploitation in 2000 in order to produce additional energy for surrounding regions.

Since the start of its operations, the reservoir has not reserved water for long periods of time. Approximately  of water is received from Kura and the same volume is discharged at the same time.

See also 
 Rivers and lakes in Azerbaijan
 Mingachevir reservoir
 Shamkir reservoir
 Araz reservoir

References

External links 
Satellite image of Yenikend Reservoir

Reservoirs in Azerbaijan
Shamkir District